Joseph Demicoli (born 31 October 1914, date of death unknown) was a Maltese water polo player. He competed in the men's tournament at the 1936 Summer Olympics.

References

1914 births
Year of death missing
Maltese male water polo players
Olympic water polo players of Malta
Water polo players at the 1936 Summer Olympics
Place of birth missing